Natchan World is a high speed catamaran operated by the Tsugaru Kaikyō Ferry Company between the ports of Aomori and Hakodate, Japan.

History
Natchan World was built in 2008 by  Incat Group of Companies in Hobart, Tasmania. It is the sister ship to Natchan Rera.

References

Ships built by Incat
Incat high-speed craft
2008 ships